Southampton High School is a public high school located in Courtland, Virginia, United States, in Southampton County, west of Franklin and east of Emporia. It is part of  Southampton County Public Schools. The school's current facility opened in 1993.

Athletic teams compete in the Virginia High School League's AA Southside District in Region I.

Notable alumni 
Percy Ellsworth – NFL football safety
Jim Gillette, professional American football halfback
Cyrus Lawrence, football player
Riddick Parker, professional football player
Hunter Peck – Pitcher- Houston Astros
Greg Scott – NFL football defensive end

References

External links
Southampton High School

Schools in Southampton County, Virginia
Public high schools in Virginia
Educational institutions established in 1906
1906 establishments in Virginia